It's My Time is the second studio album by Puerto Rican singer-songwriter Tito El Bambino, released on October 2, 2007. The first single released was "Sólo Dime Que Sí". It reached No. 1 in the Billboard Hot Latin Charts. The second single confirmed by Tito in an interview in Puerto Rico's No Te Duermas he said "El Tra" will be the second single, which receive some airplay.

Track listing

Chart performance

See also
List of number-one Billboard Latin Rhythm Albums of 2007

References

2007 albums
Tito El Bambino albums
Albums produced by the Neptunes
EMI Latin albums
Albums produced by Luny Tunes
Albums produced by Noriega
Albums produced by Nely